Synurus is a genus of Asian plants in the tribe Cardueae within the family Asteraceae.

Synurus has a thick stem up to 1.5 meters tall. It produces large, nodding, spherical flower heads up to 6 centimeters wide with purple florets.

The anti-inflammatory properties of the plant as an herbal remedy have been well studied. It is eaten as a wild vegetable in Korea.

 Species
 Synurus deltoides (Aiton) Nakai - Russia (Chita, Amur, Primorye, Khabarovsk), China (Inner Mongolia, Hebei, Hubei, Sichuan, Henan, Anhui, Zhejiang, Ningxia, Heilongjiang, Jilin, Liaoning), Mongolia, Japan, Korea
 Synurus excelsus (Makino) Kitam. - Japan, Korea
 Synurus palmatopinnatifidus (Makino) Kitam. - Japan, Korea
 Synurus pungens (Franch. & Sav.) Kitam. - Japan

 formerly included
see Olgaea 
 Synurus diabolicus - Olgaea lomonossowii

References

External links
 
 

Cynareae
Asteraceae genera